Q15 may refer to:
 Q15 (New York City bus)
 Al Hejr, the fifteenth surah of the Quran
 , a hydrographic survey boat of the Argentine Navy